Monachoptilas is a genus of moths belonging to the family Tineidae.

Species
Monachoptilas berista Viette, 1954
Monachoptilas hyperaesthetica Meyrick, 1934
Monachoptilas musicodora Meyrick, 1934
Monachoptilas paulianella Viette, 1955
Monachoptilas petitiella Viette, 1954
Monachoptilas stempfferiella Viette, 1954

References

Tineidae
Tineidae genera
Taxa named by Edward Meyrick